Battle Cry is a 1955 Warnercolor film, starring Van Heflin, Aldo Ray, James Whitmore, Tab Hunter, Anne Francis, Dorothy Malone, Raymond Massey, and Mona Freeman in CinemaScope. The film is based on the 1953 novel by former Marine Leon Uris, who also wrote the screenplay, and was produced and directed by Raoul Walsh. The film was shot at Camp Pendleton, California, and featured a large amount of cooperation from the United States Marine Corps.

Plot
In January 1942, as many young men respond to the call for Marine Corps recruits, All-American athlete Danny Forrester boards a train in Baltimore, Maryland, after saying goodbye to his family and girl friend Kathy. The train picks up other recruits en route to the Marine training camp near San Diego, including womanizing lumberjack Andy Hookans, bookish Marion Hodgkiss, Navajo Indian Shining Lighttower, troublemaking "Spanish" Joe Gomez, L.Q. Jones of Arkansas, Speedy of Texas, and the Philadelphian Ski, who is eager to escape the slums, but upset to leave his girl friend Susan.

Several weeks later, after the arduous training of boot camp, the men are accepted into radio school and assigned to the battalion commanded by Maj. Sam "High Pockets" Huxley. The Marines continue their military training and receive rigorous communication instruction from Sgt. Mac, but on weekends they get passes to San Diego. In a sleazy bar there, Ski drowns his sorrows in alcohol and women to forget that Susan has married another man. Concerned about him, Mac and his fellow Marines go to the bar, believing they are coming to his rescue, and get in a brawl with others there. Danny is saved from excessive drinking by the married USO worker Elaine Yarborough, and begins a relationship with her, until Mac, noticing a change in his performance, arranges for him to call Kathy long-distance. Recognizing the young man's loneliness, Mac and Huxley grant him a furlough to Baltimore, during which Danny elopes with Kathy. Meanwhile, the meditative Marion, who hopes to write about his wartime experiences, meets the beautiful and mysterious Rae on the Coronado ferryboat. Although she meets him there frequently and seems to admire him greatly, she will not share with him details about her life. Marion learns why she has been evasive, when she shows up with other B-girls ordered by Joe, at a party celebrating the regiment's orders to ship out.

The men are sent to Wellington, New Zealand, where they are warmly received. Andy, who respects no woman, tries to woo the married Pat Rogers by suggesting that he fill the void left by her husband, whom he believes is fighting in Africa. After the offended Pat tells him her husband died in action, Andy apologizes for the first time ever. Pat later invites the reformed Andy to visit her parents' farm, where, despite their attraction, they agree to remain friends only. After Christmas, the Sixth Regiment, now known as "Huxley's Harlots," is sent to Guadalcanal after the invasion to "mop up" a resistant band of Japanese soldiers.

Afterward, the battle-weary men, minus Ski, who was killed by a sniper, return to New Zealand, where Pat nurses the malaria-stricken Andy and decides to risk a short-term romance with him. To restore the men's stamina, Huxley, newly promoted to lieutenant colonel, orders them to compete in a brutal 60-mile hike, and while other companies are trucked back to camp, Huxley has his men hike the whole way, blistered and near collapse, but in record-breaking time. Aware that his men are special, Huxley is frustrated when they are not ordered to Tarawa with the main invasion, but held back to clear out remaining Japanese resistance afterward. Pat is afraid of losing another love to the war and tells Andy that she wants to break up, but Andy refuses and asks her to marry him. Although frightened, she accepts and only then admits that she is pregnant. With Huxley's assistance in cutting through red tape, Andy and Pat marry, but two days later, when the men are to ship out, Andy considers deserting to stay with Pat. Instead of arresting him, Huxley asks Pat to convince Andy to return voluntarily.

At Tarawa, Huxley's men fulfill their mission, but Marion and many others are killed. Afterward, while standing by on reserve on a Hawaiian island, Huxley receives word that other battalions are being moved out for combat. Sensing the restlessness of his men, Huxley risks court-martial to convince Gen. Snipes that the talents of his battalion are being wasted. Although at first offended by Huxley's "impudence," Snipes assigns the battalion to the invasion of Red Beach, the most dangerous mission in the Saipan campaign. The men are isolated from the rest of the division, and suffer heavy casualties from artillery fired from the hills above them. Huxley is killed, and Danny and Andy are seriously injured. However, the battalion holds out until a Navy destroyer pins down the Japanese, freeing the Marines to complete their mission. Later, at a rest camp, while recuperating from the loss of a leg, Andy becomes too demoralized to communicate with Pat or his concerned friends, but tough words from Mac make him realize that Pat still loves him. Andy returns to her and his baby son after completing rehabilitation. Danny is also given a medical discharge and returns by train to Baltimore, accompanied by Mac, who is visiting the families of men killed in action. In Baltimore, they say goodbye and Danny reunites with the waiting Kathy, as fresh recruits board the train.

Cast
 Van Heflin as Major / Lieutenant Colonel Sam "High Pockets" Huxley, Commanding Officer, 2nd Battalion, 6th Marine Regiment
 Aldo Ray as Private First Class Andy Hookens
 Nancy Olson as Pat Rogers / Mrs. Pat Rogers
 James Whitmore as Master Technical Sergeant Mac
 Tab Hunter as Private First Class / Corporal Danny Forrester
 Mona Freeman as Kathy, Danny's Girl / Mrs. Danny Forrester
 Dorothy Malone as Mrs. Elaine Yarborough, USO Manager
 Raymond Massey as Major General Snipes
 Anne Francis as Rae, The Party Girl
 William Campbell as Private First Class "Ski" Wronski
 John Lupton as Private / Corporal Marion "Sister Mary" Hotchkiss
 Justus E. McQueen (later L. Q. Jones) as Private L. Q. Jones 
 Perry Lopez as Private Joe "Spanish Joe" Gomez
 Fess Parker as Private "Speedy"
 Willis Bouchey as Mr. Forrester
 Jonas Applegarth as Private Lighttower, Navajo Phonetalker
 Felix Noriego as Private Crazy Horse, Navajo Phonetalker
 Rhys Williams as Pat, Rogers's Father
 Allyn Ann McLerie as Ruby, Waitress In Diner

Awards and reception
Battle Cry received an Academy Award nomination for Scoring of a Dramatic or Comedy Picture by composer Max Steiner. The film also got critical reception from Bosley Crowther of The New York Times who criticized the film for being too focused on love rather than war, which was the opposite of what the Marines had experienced in the Pacific during World War II.

Music
The film featured the song "Honey-Babe" by Art Mooney which reached #6 on the U.S. pop chart in 1955.

See also
List of American films of 1955
List of films set in New Zealand

References

External links

1955 films
1950s English-language films
Navajo-language films
Films about Native Americans
Films scored by Max Steiner
Films based on American novels
Films based on military novels
Films directed by Raoul Walsh
Films set in 1942
Pacific War films
Films about the United States Marine Corps
American war drama films
American World War II films
1950s war drama films
Films shot in Philadelphia
CinemaScope films
Warner Bros. films
1955 drama films
Films set in San Diego
1950s American films